Framingham High School, or FHS, is an urban/suburban public high school in the city of Framingham, Massachusetts, United States, located approximately  west of Boston. Founded in 1792, as Framingham Academy, the high school is the result of the merger of Framingham North and Framingham South High Schools in 1991.

Like most high schools in the United States, it enrolls students in the ninth to twelfth grades. The school has an approximate enrollment of 2000 students, making it the twelfth largest high school in Massachusetts. Framingham High School has a racially, ethnically, economically, and linguistically diverse population (20 percent of its students are considered low-income and 30 percent have a language other than English as their first language). The school is classified as an urban high school by the state of Massachusetts.

Framingham High School has received numerous awards for being a successful urban school, including a designation as a Commonwealth Compass School by the state of Massachusetts and as a Vanguard Model School by MassInsight.

The Framingham High School Flyers compete in the Bay State League-Carey Division of the Massachusetts Interscholastic Athletic Association's Division I and their mascot is the Flyer.

History
The Framingham Academy was established in 1798, replacing the organization known as the Proprietors of the Brick School House which had formed in 1792. The town of Framingham gave the academy $1000, but some time later this was found to be illegal, and the academy was dissolved.

In 1852 the high school was formed, and later became the legal successor to the academy. Thus, the high school can be considered to be founded in either 1792 or 1852.

In 1958, mid year, a new building on Flagg Drive replaced the original high school on Union Ave. that was built in the 1920s. The original building was eventually converted to house several facilities, including the Danforth Museum and the Callahan Senior Center.

In 1963, due to an increasing school population, the original Framingham High was split into two schools, Framingham North High School and Framingham South High School. South High was located in the Flagg Drive campus in South Framingham (in the now-demolished Fuller Middle School, which was replaced with a new building at 31 Flagg Drive in 2021) and North High was located at the new school building at Winch Park on A St. in Saxonville. Originally, North High shared facilities with Winch Park Middle School ("E" & "F" halls in the current building) until 1974 when the first Cameron Middle School opened on Elm St. The two high schools remained separate until 1991 when they were merged to create a unified school under the name Framingham High School.

The two high schools were distinguished by their colors and mascots: North had the Spartans in yellow and green while South had the original town mascot Flyers in blue and white. When the time for the merger of the schools came, the district held an election to determine the fate of the colors and mascots. The winning combination was to be the Spartans in blue and white, however alumni of the original Framingham High raised a protest that the town should revert to the original mascot and colors which happened to be used by Framingham South. After discussion with the student body, it was agreed that the colors and mascot would revert to the original set.

On a visit on October 20, 1994, President Bill Clinton signed the Improving America's Schools Act (IASA) in the school's John F. Kennedy gymnasium.

Academics
In the late 1990s, Framingham High School was labeled underperforming. Through multiple school reforms in the early and mid 2000s, Framingham High dramatically increased their MCAS (Massachusetts state graduation assessment) scores and the number of students taking Advanced Placement courses increased. In recent years, Framingham High has been labeled an "over-performing" school on standardized assessments, compared to other districts of similar student populations. In 2008, Framingham High was ranked by Newsweek in the top 500 high schools in the United States.

Framingham High School has received press for its success with students in the English as a Second Language Program. Noting that 69 percent of Framingham students are considered proficient in English after three or more years and the school has higher graduation rates and MCAS scores than most other districts with large groups of English-learners. Only 17 percent of Framingham's English Language Learners drop out of school, half that of districts with similar demographics. Part of this successes is attributed to Framingham's use of a provision in the Massachusetts law by having parents waive their right to an all-English education. In Framingham, very few parents of high schoolers have chosen the English-only option.

Framingham High School has a unique co-teaching program, where most teachers at the school co-teach a course with a colleague from the same discipline. This helps reduce the student-teacher ratio in the classroom and intends to lead to greater faculty collegiality and collaboration. It contributed to the school's earning of Commonwealth Compass School designation.

Framingham High School also has several innovative programs for at-risk and struggling students, including Resiliency for Life, Step Up to Excellence, Mazie Mentoring Program, Academic Development Center (peer-to-peer school day tutoring) and the Phoenix Program, as well as the Thayer Campus, an alternative high school located in south Framingham.

In 2004, Framingham High School launched a "homeroom adviser" program, hoping to reduce the high rate of freshman students being forced to repeat their first year, a problem for many schools in the state. The advisers have around 25 students each, and watch the students' grades and attendance, meet with them individually, and may also consult with parents or teachers. It is hoped that the program will catch struggling students early and encourage them to feel more accountable for their studies

Demographics

Framingham High School's racial/ethnic demographics for the 2011–2012 school year are as follows:
 , approximately 20 percent of the school's white population (and 14 percent of the entire school population) is of Brazilian descent.

Other demographics:

Framingham High School is a racially, ethnically, and economically diverse school and in part this relates to the town of Framingham being historically a hub for immigrants to the United States. The student body of Framingham High is made up of significant immigrant (or children of immigrant) populations from Brazil, the Caribbean, South and Central America, Russia, Asia, and Africa.

Extracurricular activities

Athletics
The Framingham High School Flyers compete in the Bay State League-Carey Division of the Massachusetts Interscholastic Athletic Association's Division I. The school offers and competes competitively in a number of sports, including dance, cross-country, outdoor track, indoor track, cheerleading, baseball, basketball, field hockey, fencing, american football, golf, gymnastics, ice hockey, lacrosse, soccer, tennis, swimming, softball, wrestling, and volleyball.

Drama company
The school offers a theatre program for all levels of young actors.

The Drama Company presents three annual shows, one of which is a one-act play for a statewide festival ran by the Massachusetts Educational Theater Guild. Framingham has won numerous awards for acting and technical design and often makes it to the state finals.  In 2006, and 10 years later in 2016, the Drama Company won the METG state finals with their productions of Tales of Trickery (2006) and Sideways Stories from Wayside School (2016).

FHS-TV (Home of "Flyer News")
Framingham High School Television's (FHS-TV) news show "Flyer News" began broadcasting a live newscast at 7:15 a.m. every day to the high school in 1997, and then to the entire town in 2005. Flyer News is run by television production teacher Noah Lin and his students. A Flyer News episode may consist of student-produced segments such as Sez-You, which interviews the student body on various topics; Webcrawler, a technology segment; Word of the Week, asking students to define a different word each week and broadcasting the more entertaining responses; New England Sports Minute, which covers the latest news in the New England professional sporting world; Sports Update, which brings updates about Framingham High School sports; and a daily segment, Homeroom Headlines, giving morning announcements, among other things. One of Flyer News' focal points is to get the student opinion on the issues to voice the student-body's beliefs. The station also airs numerous sports games, as well as student-produced movies, music videos, and public service announcements.

Exchange program
The school participated in a sister-city exchange program with Lomonosov, Russia, a suburb of St. Petersburg. George Perrone, now-retired Music Director, brought a contingent of musicians to perform at several venues in Lomonosov. In return, Lomonosov residents visited Framingham and Framingham High.  Students participated in an exchange program with China in 2016.

Notable alumni

Boris Bede, gridiron football player
Blake Bellefeuille, professional ice hockey player
Stan Benjamin (1914–2009), Major League Baseball player and scout
Andrea Berloff, screenwriter and author of World Trade Center
David Blatt (born 1959), class of 1977, basketball player and coach, Israel and various European teams, 2012 Olympic coach, former head coach of Cleveland Cavaliers
Royal L. Bolling, Massachusetts state senator and the school's first African-American class president
Arthur Raymond Brooks, World War I fighter ace
Bill Brooks, former NFL football player (1986–1996)
Sashi Brown, President of the National Football League's Baltimore Ravens
Michael J. Clouse, record producer and songwriter
Monique Curnen, actress, notable for portraying Det. Anna Ramirez in The Dark Knight
Leila Goldkuhl, fashion model, contestant on America's Next Top Model: College Edition
Rufus Harris, former professional basketball player
Bill Hunnefield, former MLB player (Chicago White Sox, Cleveland Indians, Boston Braves, New York Giants)
Lou Merloni, Major League Baseball player, NESN radio talk show host on WEEI 93.7 FM
Katie Nolan, television sports personality
Danny O'Connor, professional boxer
Cyrus Peirce, graduate of Framingham Academy circa 1806 and first head of what is now Framingham State College
R. J. Brewer ("Hurricane" John Walters), professional wrestler, participated in WWE and Ring of Honor
Peter Taglianetti, NHL hockey player
Nancy Travis, actress
Freedom Williams, musical performer, C+C Music Factory vocalist

References

External links
School website
Framingham High School Photography Blog
Photograph of Clinton at Framingham
Remarks of Sen. Kennedy at Framingham High School

Educational institutions established in 1792
Framingham, Massachusetts
Public high schools in Massachusetts
Schools in Middlesex County, Massachusetts
Bay State Conference